Abgol is a village in Par Zeytun Rural District, Meymand District, Firuzabad County, Fars Province, Iran. At the 2006 census, its population was 1,579, in 356 families.

References 

Populated places in Firuzabad County